Poul Edvard Poulsson (18 April 1858 – 19 March 1935) was a Norwegian physician. He was born in Larvik, and was the father of lawyer Erik Tutein Poulsson and a father-in-law of Gabriel Langfeldt. Poulsson was a pioneer in pharmacology in Norway. He was appointed extraordinary professor at the University of Oslo from 1895 (and ordinary professor from 1913). After his retirement as professor in 1928, he was appointed manager of the recently established Statens Vitaminlaboratorium. Among his works are Om strykninets lammende virkning from 1889, Lærebog i farmakologi for læger og studerende from 1905, and Om det fettopløselige vitamin og torskelevertran from 1923. He was a fellow of the Norwegian Academy of Science and Letters from 1894.

References

1858 births
1935 deaths
People from Larvik
Norwegian pharmacologists
Academic staff of the University of Oslo
Norwegian medical writers
Norwegian textbook writers
Members of the Norwegian Academy of Science and Letters